Helix for orchestra is a single-movement orchestral composition by the Finnish composer Esa-Pekka Salonen.  The work was commissioned by the BBC and was first performed August 27, 2005 at The Proms by the World Orchestra for Peace under conductor Valery Gergiev, to whom the piece is dedicated.

Composition
Helix has a duration of roughly 9 minutes and is composed in one continuous movement.  Salonen compared the form of the work to a spiral or coil, writing in the score program notes:

Instrumentation
The work is scored for three flutes (doubling piccolo), three oboes (doubling cor anglais), two clarinets, two bassoons, contrabassoon, four French horns, three trumpets, three trombones, tuba, timpani, five percussionists, harp, and strings.

Reception
Anne Midgette of The New York Times called Helix "an exuberant showpiece" and wrote, "Its gimmick is that the tempo markings steadily increase throughout, adding propulsive force to a work that, thick with detail, throws out sounds and ideas as it builds steam."  Stephen Johnson of BBC Music Magazine compared the work favorably to Salonen's Piano Concerto, writing, "The driven and dazzlingly colourful Helix matches all the Concerto can offer in less than a third of its length."  Richard S. Ginell of the Los Angeles Times described it as "basically a musical coil that begins almost in a dream-like haze and accelerates and thickens and tightens until the overloaded structure comes to a screaming halt just short of the nine-minute mark."  Richard Scheinin of the San Jose Mercury News also praised the composition and said, "Teeming with detail, the piece is a steady funneling of energy and suspense, self-multiplying. Through the strings, it also grew long-lined, romantic — but with a shocking hatchet finish. Only nine minutes long, it was impressive; Salonen seemed to be saying, 'This is who I am.'"

References

Compositions by Esa-Pekka Salonen
2005 compositions
Compositions for symphony orchestra
Music commissioned by the BBC